Brian McGrory (born November 30, 1961) is an American journalist, author and publishing executive. He is currently the chair of the department of journalism at Boston University. He was the editor of The Boston Globe from December 2012 through December 2022.

Biography
McGrory was born in Boston, and grew up in Roslindale and Weymouth, Massachusetts. He graduated from Bates College in Lewiston, Maine, with a Bachelor of Arts in 1984. His began his journalism career with the New Haven Register and The Patriot Ledger.

McGrory joined The Boston Globe in 1989 as a Metro columnist,  and quickly moved up the ranks to associate editor. He has served as a White House reporter, and has written four novels plus a memoir. In 2011, he received a Scripps-Howard award for commentary and a Sigma Delta Chi Award for column writing.

McGrory was named editor of the Globe in December 2012, succeeding Martin Baron. His staff won a Pulitzer Prize for Breaking News Reporting in 2014 for coverage of the Boston Marathon bombing in 2013.

In 2018, former Globe editor Hilary Sargent accused McGrory of sexual harassment by sending her an inappropriate text while McGrory was overseeing her work. McGrory denied the allegation, and an internal investigation cleared him of wrongdoing.

On September 7, 2022, McGrory announced he is stepping down as editor of the Globe at the end of 2022 and will become the Chair of Journalism at Boston University.

Bibliography

Jack Flynn Series 

 The Incumbent (2000)
 The Nominee (2002)
 Dead Line (2004)
 Strangled (2007)

Other 

 Buddy: How a Rooster Made Me a Family Man (2013)

References 

1960s births
Living people
Year of birth missing (living people)
People from Boston
Bates College alumni
Journalists from Massachusetts
The Boston Globe people
American newspaper editors